Vengo Naciendo (Being Born) is an album released by Cuban singer-songwriter Pablo Milanés on January 12, 1999. The album earned Milanés a Latin Grammy Award nomination for Best Pop Vocal Album.

Track listing
This information adapted from Allmusic.

Certification

References

1999 albums
Pablo Milanés albums
Spanish-language albums